Kadin or Kadın may refer to
KADIN, Indonesian Chamber of Commerce and Industry
Kadin (name)
Kadın (title), for an imperial consort of the Sultan of the Ottoman Empire 
Kadin Island in southeastern Alaska
Kadin Jelovac, a village in Bosnia and Herzegovina
Kadin most, a 15th-century stone arch bridge over the Struma River in Bulgaria
O Kadın, a 1982 Turkish romantic drama film
Haremde Dört Kadın, a 1965 Turkish drama film
Hükümet Kadın, a 2013 Turkish comedy film
Kadın (TV series), a 2017 Turkish television series

See also
Khatun
Hatun